Alfredo Sergio Cuadra Tinajero (born 17 August 1976) is a Mexican politician from the National Action Party. In 2012 he served as Deputy of the LXI Legislature of the Mexican Congress representing Nuevo León.

References

1976 births
Living people
Politicians from Nuevo León
National Action Party (Mexico) politicians
21st-century Mexican politicians
Deputies of the LXI Legislature of Mexico
Members of the Chamber of Deputies (Mexico) for Nuevo León